Marion Catherine "Kitty" Barne (17 November 1882 – 3 February 1961) was a British screenwriter and author of children's books, especially on music and musical themes. She won the 1940 Carnegie Medal for British children's books.

Biography
Barne was born in Petersham, Surrey, but was brought up in Somerset and Sussex, and later studied at the Royal College of Music.  On 12 April 1912, in Eastbourne, she married Eric Streatfeild, thus becoming the cousin-in-law of another popular children's writer Noel Streatfeild. Eric Streatfeild was the first cousin of Noel Streatfeild's father.

Barne was a member of the Women's Voluntary Service, responsible for the reception of children evacuated to Sussex.  During the war years, she published six novels, most notably Visitors from London about evacuees (J. M. Dent, 1940). For that work she won the annual Carnegie Medal from the Library Association, recognising the year's best children's book by a British subject.

She is possibly best known now for her pony books Rosina Copper and its sequel Rosina and Son, about the true story of an Argentine polo pony mare that was rescued from neglect after being ordered to be killed. They were illustrated by Alfons Purtscher and Marcia Lane Foster respectively.

Apart from her novels, she wrote some non-fiction books, including a biography of Elizabeth Fry (who was her husband's great-grandmother) in 1950, a book about the orchestra, a history of the Girl Guides and a book of Camp Fire Songs (1944).  She was Commissioner for Music and Drama for the Girl Guides  for some years where she was assisted by Mary Chater.
Ruth Gervis, the illustrator of a number of her books, said of her:

She died on 3 February 1961 after a long illness.

Selected works

The Easter Holidays aka Secret of the Sandhills (1935)
She Shall Have Music (1938)
Family Footlights (1939)
Visitors from London (1940)
Listening to the Orchestra (1941)
May I Keep Dogs? aka Bracken, My Dog (1941)
We'll Meet in England  (1942)
The Amber Gate (1942)
Three and a Pigeon (1944)
In the Same Boat  (1945)
Here Come the Girl Guides (1946)
Musical Honours (1947)
Bracken My Dog (1949)
Dusty's Windmill (1949)
Roly's Dog (1950)
Elizabeth Fry: a story biography (1950)
The Windmill Mystery (1950)
Barbie (1952)
Admiral's Walk (1953)
Music Perhaps (1953)
Rosina Copper (1954)
Tann's Boarders (1955)
Rosina and Son (1956)

See also

References

External links

Cheri Lloyd (2006) A Nation at War: The Work of Kitty Barne and Mary Treadgold in Pat Pinsent (ed.) Out of the Attic

British children's writers
Pony books
Carnegie Medal in Literature winners
Alumni of the Royal College of Music
1882 births
1961 deaths